Didier Gallet (born 14 August 1945) is a French rower. He competed in two events at the 1980 Summer Olympics.

References

1945 births
Living people
French male rowers
Olympic rowers of France
Rowers at the 1980 Summer Olympics
Place of birth missing (living people)